David Dontay Thornton (born November 1, 1978) is a former outside linebacker for the Indianapolis Colts and Tennessee Titans of the National Football League. In 2012 Thornton joined the Colts as the director of player engagement.

College career
Thornton played college football at the University of North Carolina where he was teammates with Julius Peppers, and Ryan Sims. Originally a walk-on, Thornton's play eventually earned him a scholarship. In his senior year, Thornton was named second-team All-ACC and team MVP.

Professional career

Indianapolis Colts
Thornton was drafted in the fourth round in the 2002 NFL Draft by the Indianapolis Colts. Thornton best season came in 2003 when he led the Colts with 145 tackles and made two interceptions. In the 2005 season Thornton made 83 tackles and two quarterback sacks.

Tennessee Titans
He became an unrestricted free agent and signed a five-year deal with the Titans on March 13, 2006 . After missing the 2010 season due to a hip injury, he retired on August 5, 2011.

NFL career statistics

Personal life
In 2012, he became the director of player engagement with the Colts.

References

1978 births
Living people
People from Goldsboro, North Carolina
Players of American football from North Carolina
American football outside linebackers
North Carolina Tar Heels football players
Indianapolis Colts players
Tennessee Titans players
Ed Block Courage Award recipients